RAR or Rar may refer to:

 Radio acoustic ranging, a non-visual technique for determining a ship's position at sea
 "rar", the ISO 639-2 code for the Cook Islands Māori language
 RAR (file format), a proprietary compressed archive file format in computer software
 Rarotonga International Airport, Cook Islands, IATA code RAR
 Rarus, or Rar, a figure in Greek mythology
 Retinoic acid receptor, a type of protein
 Rhodesian African Rifles, a unit of the Rhodesian Army
 Rock Against Racism, a UK movement
 Rock am Ring and Rock im Park, a German rock music festival
 Royal Australian Regiment, a unit of the Australian Army
 Ruger American Rifle, a line of centerfire bolt-action rifles
 Grupo RAR, a Portuguese company
 WinRAR, RAR, and UNRAR computer software for compressed archive files
 Ridotto Alpino Repubblicano, Republican Alpine Redoubt (RAR), intended last stronghold of the Italian fascists at the end of World War II
 Rarh region, region in eastern India